Thomas Gordon Ross (26 July 1878 – 23 August 1952) was an Australian rules footballer who played with Fitzroy and Carlton.

Sources

Holmesby, Russell & Main, Jim (2009). The Encyclopedia of AFL Footballers. 8th ed. Melbourne: Bas Publishing.

Australian rules footballers from Victoria (Australia)
Fitzroy Football Club players
Carlton Football Club players
1878 births
1952 deaths